Devon John Landau (1960–2007) was a Canadian-born Australian who had a diverse career in producing, writing and directing short films, as an accomplished artist and sculptor and working in the financial services industry as a client manager and project manager.

Completed films included Zork and Zamien's Day Out (2004) and Floater - A Ghost Story (2006).

These films were selected for screening around the world including the San Francisco and Bucharest film festivals.

His sculptures were regularly exhibited in Sydney art galleries and featured in an exhibition within the Sydney Botanic Gardens in 2006. He was profiled on the community television show, "Yianni's City Life" in 2006 showing and discussing his artworks.

References

 
  
 
 
 
 
 

Canadian emigrants to Australia
Australian film producers
Australian film directors
1960 births
2007 deaths